Tina is an 2021 documentary film, directed by Dan Lindsay and T. J. Martin. It follows the life and career of musician Tina Turner.

The film had its world premiere at the Berlin International Film Festival on March 2, 2021. It was released in the United States on March 27, 2021, by HBO, and in the United Kingdom on March 28, 2021, by Altitude Film Distribution.

Synopsis
The film follows the life and career of musician Tina Turner, with Turner appearing in the film alongside Angela Bassett, Oprah Winfrey, Kurt Loder, Katori Hall, Erwin Bach, Carl Arrington, Jimmy Thomas, Le'Juene Fletcher, Rhonda Graam, Roger Davies and Terry Britten.

In a March 2021 interview with Today, Turner described the film as a parallel story to her memoir.. ......Happiness Becomes You, which was released in December 2020 by Atria Books. The film is dedicated to Tina Turner's son Craig Turner and to Rhonda Graam who was Tina Turner's close friend, road manager and personal assistant for over 45 years.

Production
In May 2018, it was announced Dan Lindsay and T.J. Martin would direct the film, with Tina Turner set to participate with Altitude Film Distribution set to distribute in the United Kingdom.

Release
Tina had its world premiere at the Berlin International Film Festival on March 2, 2021. It was released in the United States on March 27, 2021, by HBO. The film drew 1.1 million viewers, the best ratings for an HBO documentary since Leaving Neverland (2019), which had 1.3 million viewers tune into part one. It was released in the United Kingdom on March 28, 2021, by Altitude Film Distribution, and simulcast on Sky Documentaries. Universal Pictures Home Entertainment distributed the documentary elsewhere.

Reception
Upon its premiere at the 2021 Berlin Film Festival, the film received positive reviews from critics. The review aggregator website Rotten Tomatoes reports that 92% of 86 reviews of the film were positive, with an average rating of 8/10. The website's consensus reads, "Tina recounts the ups and downs of the singer's life with startling candor and insight, providing an inspiring testament to resilience."

Reportedly, Turner's son Ronnie Turner and his wife Afida Turner felt the film was "well done" in that it "credited Ike for his success as a singer-songwriter." The couple, as well as Turner's adopted sons Ike Turner Jr. and Michael Turner, were disappointed that her sons were not asked to be involved in the film and it didn't examine Turner's estranged relationship with her children.

Awards and nominations

References

External links
 
 
 

2021 films
2021 documentary films
American documentary films
British documentary films
HBO documentary films
Universal Pictures films
Documentary films about African Americans
Tina Turner
2020s English-language films
2020s American films
2020s British films